Waste management in Bangladesh faces many challenges due to its large, rapidly growing population in a densely populated country.

Bangladesh is the ninth most populous and twelfth most densely populated country in the world. In particular, the projected urban population growth rate from 2010 to 2015 is 3%.  With this population growth, there is an increasing problem of waste management particularly in the larger cities. Currently, according to an UNFPA report, Dhaka is one of the most polluted cities in the world and one of the issues concerned is the management of municipal waste.
As for solid waste like paper, carton, metal, plastics, Pet Bottles, e-waste, there was no initiatives to ensure environment friendly recycling. But from 2018 there is a local startup named BD Recycle (www.bdrecycle.com) working to digitalized and organize solid waste recycling. BD Recycle have a webapp and Android  
app to buy waste from corporates, households, and factories. BD Recycle collect waste, then sort waste and send to factory end recycler who ensure sustainable recycling.

Waste creation 

Current (2012) waste generation in Bangladesh is around 22.4 million tonnes per year or 150 kg/cap/year. There is an increasing rate of waste generation in Bangladesh and it is projected to reach 47, 064 tonnes per day by 2025. The rate of waste generation is expected to increase to 220 kg/cap/year in 2025. A significant percentage of the population has zero access to proper waste disposal services, which will in effect lead to the problem of waste mismanagement.
 
The total waste collection rate in major cities of Bangladesh such as Dhaka is only 37%. When waste is not properly collected, it will be illegally disposed of and this will pose serious environmental and health hazards to the Bangladeshis.

Negative impacts of poor waste management 
One of the most adverse impacts of poor waste management, especially municipal waste, is the incidence and prevalence of diseases such as malaria and respiratory problems, as well as other illnesses through the contamination of ground water. Biomedical wastes pose great danger in Bangladesh too as a report estimated that 20% of the biomedical waste is "highly infectious" and is a hazard since it is often disposed of into the sewage system or drains.  Such poor sanitation has serious consequences for the health of the residents and a report suggests that "most of the child mortality could be related with this problem".  With regards to the living standards, solid waste leads to blockage in the drainage system which leads to flooding in the streets. Consequently, mosquitoes and bad odour are among the negative impacts resulted.

Landfills in most countries including in Bangladesh contribute to methane emissions which accelerates climate change. The Matuail Sanitary Landfill releases methane emissions equivalent to 190,000 cars.

Current government efforts 
There have been recent developments in Bangladesh to improve waste management, especially in urban cities. In Dhaka, Dhaka City Corporation with support from the Japan International Corporation Agency (JICA) has a master plan underway to better handle the solid waste management in Dhaka.  For example, Social Business Enterprise Waste Concern, has sprung up to tackle the municipal waste accumulation problem through working with the households. UNICEF has also initiated recycling programs and waste control with the city corporations and municipalities.  However, currently, there are still insufficient incentives to improve the standard of waste management across all relevant sectors, especially for industrial waste and medical waste.

References 

Environmental issues in Bangladesh
Bangladesh